Euthymides was an ancient Athenian potter and painter of vases, primarily active between 515 and 500 BC. He was a member of the Greek art movement later to be known as the Pioneer Group for their exploration of the new decorative style known as red-figure pottery. Euthymides was the teacher of another Athenian red-figure vase painter, the Kleophrades Painter.

Euthymides was admired for his portrayal of human movement and studies of perspective, his painted figures being amongst the first to show foreshortened limbs. He was more minimalist than others in the movement, and his tendency was to draw relatively few figures, and only rarely overlap them.

His works were normally inscribed "Euthymides painted me". Euthymides was a rival of his fellow Athenian Euphronios, and one of his amphorae is additionally marked with the playful taunt "hos oudepote Euphronios", words which have been variously interpreted as "as never Euphronios [could do]", or "this wasn't one of Euphronios".

Only eight vessels signed by Euthymides survive, six signed as painter, and two as potter. His most famous work is probably The Revelers Vase, an amphora depicting three men partying. They are presumably drunk; one of them is holding a kantharos, a large drinking vessel.

An unsigned two-handled amphora (Boston 63.1515) is attributed to the "circle of Euthymides".

References 

Further Reading:
 (see index)

External Links:
The Metropolitan Museum of Art Guide, a collection catalog from The Metropolitan Museum of Art containing information on Euthymides (page 321)

 Neils, J: Phintias and Euthymides
 Euthymides' vase in the Louvre collection

6th-century BC deaths
6th-century BC Athenians
Ancient Greek vase painters
Ancient Greek potters
Year of birth unknown